The following is a timeline of the history of the city of Orléans, France.

Prior to 20th century

 2nd century – Roman Catholic Diocese of Orléans established.
 463 – Battle of Orleans (463).
 511 – First Council of Orléans held.
 548 – Fifth Council of Orléans held.
 1278 – Orléans Cathedral construction begins.
 1429 – Siege of Orléans.
 1439 –  held.
 1490 – Printing press in operation.
 1508 –  built.
 1549 –  built.
 1560 –  held.
 1714 –  (library) founded.
 1763 – George V Bridge, Orléans opens.
 1790 – Orléans becomes part of the Loiret souveraineté.
 1797 – Musée des Beaux-Arts d'Orléans established.
 1800 – Population: 41,937.
 1809 –  active.
 1843 – Gare d'Orléans opens.
 1870 – December: Battle of Orléans.
 1872 –  begins operating.
 1873 –  begins operating.
 1877 –  begins operating.
 1886 – Population: 60,826.

20th century

 1905 –  built.
 1911 – Population: 72,096.
 1958 –  built.
 1966 – University of Orléans active.
 1975
  opens.
 Population: 106,246.
 1977 –  opens.
 1982 – Orleans becomes part of the Centre-Val de Loire region.
 1988 –  opens.
 1989 – March: 1989 French municipal elections held.
 1996 – Zénith d'Orléans arena opens.
 2000 – Orléans tramway begins operating.

21st century

 2005 – Open d'Orléans tennis tournament begins.
 2008 – Gare d'Orléans rebuilt.
 2012 – Population: 114,286.
 2014 – March:  held.
 2015 – Olivier Carré becomes mayor.

See also
 Orléans#History
 , standalone article at fr.wiki
 
 Duke of Orléans, including a list of the dukes
 
 

Other cities in the Centre-Val de Loire region:
 Timeline of Bourges
 Timeline of Tours

References

This article incorporates information from the French Wikipedia.

Bibliography

in English

in French

External links

 Items related to Orleans, various dates (via Europeana).
 Items related to Orleans, various dates (via Digital Public Library of America).

orleans
History of Orléans
Years in France
orleans